This list of tallest buildings in Halifax refers to the tallest buildings in the municipality of Halifax, Nova Scotia, Canada. Halifax, with an estimated population of 439,819 in 2021, is the most populous municipality in Atlantic Canada. 

However, the tallest high-rise building in Halifax will soon change as there are at least three high-rise buildings (The Vuze included) proposed-or-under-construction that will exceed  in height. These buildings are the Maristella at King's Wharf, and Richmond Yards.

Tallest buildings
This list ranks buildings in Halifax that stand at least 60 m (197 ft) tall, based on CTBUH height measurement standards. This includes spires and architectural details but does not include antenna masts. An equal sign (=) following a rank indicates the same height between two or more buildings.

Proposed buildings or buildings under-construction

Proposed

The Maristella at King's Wharf is in Downtown Dartmouth, and Richmond Yards is on the Halifax Peninsula.

Under construction

Timeline of tallest buildings

See also

 List of tallest buildings in Atlantic Canada
 Architecture of Canada
 Canadian Centre for Architecture
 Society of Architectural Historians

References

Halifax

Tallest buildings in Halifax
Buildings